Robert Newman (March 20, 1752 – May 26, 1804) was an American sexton at the Old North Church in Boston, Massachusetts. He is considered a Patriot in the American Revolution for hanging lanterns in his church's steeple on April 18, 1775, part of a warning signal devised by Paul Revere during the Battles of Lexington and Concord.

Life and career

Newman had become sexton of Christ Church, now known as Old North Church, in 1772. He lived with his mother in 1775, and she was renting part of their home to British officers. After pretending to go to bed on the night of April 18, Newman snuck out of his house undetected by the officers and joined vestryman John Pulling and Thomas Bernard, who assisted him with the signal. Bernard served as a lookout while Pulling and Newman went to the belfry, the tallest structure in the area. Using a code devised by Revere, Newman hung two lanterns in the church's belfry to warn Patriots that the British were about to descend upon Lexington via the Charles River. The signal was spotted across the river, and allies began spreading the word. Newman returned home after the signal was set, and though he was later arrested, nothing could be proven against him. He said he had given the keys of the church to Pulling, and when British authorities went to question Pulling, he had already escaped to Nantucket, where he remained until it was safe to return.

Newman continued as sexton until his death. The famous steeple was toppled by a Snow Hurricane of 1804 in the fall after Newman died. He was survived by his second wife, Mary Hammon, whom he married in 1790. He is buried at Copp's Hill Burying Ground in Boston. His collected letters were published on the bicentennial of his signal, in 1975.

References

External links
 

1752 births
1804 deaths
Patriots in the American Revolution
People from colonial Boston
People of colonial Massachusetts
Burials in Boston